Lieutenant General Samane Vignaket (Lao: ສະໝານ ວິຍະເກດ; 3 March 1927 – 22 July 2016) was a Vietnamese descent-Laotian national politician, Minister of Education, Head of Party Central Committee Organization Board, Vice Minister of Defense, Director of the General Political Bureau, President of the National Election Committee for the National Assembly Fourth Legislature, and President of the National Assembly of Laos from 1993 to 2006. He was born in Phichit Province, Siam to Vietnamese immigrant family. (In official biography before he died, he was identified that he was born in Attapeu Province.) He was in charge of ideological and cultural works of the Lao People's Revolutionary Party (LPRP), and he was a member of the 4th, 5th, 6th, 7th and 8th Politburo, a member of the 3rd Secretariat of the LPRP. He died at 00.24 am on July 22, 2016 at the age of 89.

References

Specific

Bibliography
Books:
 

1927 births
2016 deaths
Members of the 2nd Central Committee of the Lao People's Revolutionary Party
Members of the 3rd Central Committee of the Lao People's Revolutionary Party
Members of the 4th Central Committee of the Lao People's Revolutionary Party
Members of the 5th Central Committee of the Lao People's Revolutionary Party
Members of the 6th Central Committee of the Lao People's Revolutionary Party
Members of the 7th Central Committee of the Lao People's Revolutionary Party
Members of the 8th Central Committee of the Lao People's Revolutionary Party
Members of the 3rd Secretariat of the Lao People's Revolutionary Party
Members of the 4th Secretariat of the Lao People's Revolutionary Party
Members of the 4th Politburo of the Lao People's Revolutionary Party
Members of the 5th Politburo of the Lao People's Revolutionary Party
Members of the 6th Politburo of the Lao People's Revolutionary Party
Members of the 7th Politburo of the Lao People's Revolutionary Party
Members of the 8th Politburo of the Lao People's Revolutionary Party
Presidents of the National Assembly of Laos
Lao People's Revolutionary Party politicians
Samane Vignaket